The North West Shelf is a continental shelf region of Western Australia. It includes an extensive oil and gas region off the North West Australia coast in the Pilbara region.

Geology
Considerable parts of the region are the highest prospective gas and oil areas of Australia. The main sedimentary basin providing the opportunity is the Northern Carnarvon Basin - however it is only one part of the regional complex.

Oil and gas
It has a considerable number of oil and gas wells, pipelines, production areas and support facilities.

Location 
As an area it is located in the Indian Ocean between North West Cape and  Dampier. Dampier is usually considered the main administrative locality for the shelf.

Production areas 
The production areas are located offshore and within the jurisdiction of the Western Australian state government.

The two main production areas are the Thevenard Production Area close to Onslow, and the Varanus Production Area west of Dampier.

Oil fields
The North West Shelf oil extraction is negligible compared to the volume of gas produced.

Gas project 

The North West Shelf Venture is a project to extract resources within the region from various gas fields - however it is considered to be only in part of the whole shelf region. It involves developments on the Burrup Peninsula, Barrow Island and other locations.

See also
Regions of Western Australia

References

Further reading
 (1980) State of excitement over North-West Shelf Gas Fields. Petroleum gazette, Sept. 1980, p. 58-62,

 
Continental shelves
North West Western Australia
Oil fields of Australia
IMCRA meso-scale bioregions